Utricularia subulata, the zigzag bladderwort, is a small annual, terrestrial carnivorous plant that belongs to the genus Utricularia (family Lentibulariaceae). It is the most widely distributed species in the genus, being almost pantropical.

See also 
 List of Utricularia species

References

External links 
Utricularia subulata in Brunken, U., Schmidt, M., Dressler, S., Janssen, T., Thiombiano, A. & Zizka, G. 2008. West African plants - A Photo Guide. www.westafricanplants.senckenberg.de.

Carnivorous plants of Africa
Carnivorous plants of Asia
Carnivorous plants of Central America
Carnivorous plants of Europe
Carnivorous plants of North America
Carnivorous plants of South America
subulata
Plants described in 1753
Taxa named by Carl Linnaeus